The wedding of Princess Alexandra of Kent and The Honourable Angus Ogilvy took place on Wednesday, 24 April 1963 at Westminster Abbey. Princess Alexandra was the only daughter and second child of Prince George, Duke of Kent, and Princess Marina of Greece and Denmark, while Ogilvy was the second son and fifth child of the 12th Earl of Airlie and Lady Alexandra Coke.

The wedding was a traditional Anglican wedding service according to the Book of Common Prayer. Eric Abbott, Dean of Westminster, presided at the service, and Michael Ramsey, Archbishop of Canterbury, conducted the marriage. Notable figures in attendance included many members of other royal families, national figures and members of the bride's and groom's families. A reception was held afterwards at St James's Palace. 

The wedding was watched by an estimated television audience of 200 million people.

Engagement
Princess Alexandra of Kent, granddaughter of King George V, first met businessman Angus Ogilvy, son of the 12th Earl of Airlie, at a ball at Luton Hoo, the Bedfordshire home of her cousin, Lady Zia Wernher. Ogilvy's grandmother, Mabell, Countess of Airlie, had been a friend and Lady of the Bedchamber to Alexandra's grandmother, Queen Mary. Throughout their eight-year courtship, the pair often met at Cluniemore, the Perthshire home of Lady Zia's daughter, Myra Butter.

Princess Marina announced the engagement of her daughter Princess Alexandra of Kent to The Hon. Angus Ogilvy on 19 November 1962 at Kensington Palace. Ogilvy presented Alexandra with an engagement ring made of a cabochon sapphire set in gold and surrounded by diamonds on both sides. The Queen gave her consent to the union on 19 December 1962.

On 22 April, two nights before the wedding, the Queen hosted a white-tie ball for 2000 guests at Windsor Castle. Ogilvy had a set of diamond and turquoise flowers the Princess had worn throughout her youth turned into a larger tiara and presented it along with a coordinating pair of earrings and copy of Queen Victoria's Golden Jubilee Necklace from the jeweller Collingwood to his bride.

Wedding

The wedding was held on Wednesday, 24 April 1963 at 12:00 BST at Westminster Abbey. Alexandra became the 12th member of the royal family to be married in the Abbey.

The traditional Anglican wedding service was conducted according to the Book of Common Prayer by The Very Rev. Eric Abbott, Dean of Westminster, and The Most Rev. and Rt Hon. Michael Ramsey, Archbishop of Canterbury. 

After the service, the newlyweds travelled in the glass coach to St. James's Palace for the wedding breakfast. The couple honeymooned at Birkhall on the Balmoral estate.

Music
Prior to the service, the organist of the Abbey played pieces by Johann Sebastian Bach, George Frederic Handel, Herbert Howells and William Henry Harris. Princess Alexandra walked down the aisle on the arm of her brother, The Duke of Kent, to the hymn Holy, Holy, Holy. Throughout the service, the hymns God be in my head, and in my understanding and Love Divine, All Loves Excelling were sung. The National Anthem was sung, and during the signing of the register, anthems by Christopher Tye, Thomas Weelkes, and Handel were sung. The newlywed couple recessed to Charles-Marie Widor's "Toccata" from Symphony for Organ No. 5 and William Walton's Crown Imperial.

Clothing
The bride wore a wedding dress of Valenciennes lace, with matching veil and train, designed by John Cavanagh. The lace had to be made in France, with special customs arrangements being made so that the press was not notified of its arrival in Britain. The wedding dress included a piece of lace from the bride's late grandmother, Princess Nicholas of Greece and Denmark, and the veil worn by Lady Patricia Ramsey at her own wedding in 1919. She wore the diamond fringe tiara given to her mother by the City of London as a wedding gift in 1934. The bridegroom wore morning dress.

The Queen wore an eau-de-nil dress with a matching three-quarter sleeves chiffon overcoat by Norman Hartnell and a hat by Simone Mirman. In 2016, The Queen's ensemble was on display during the exhibition "Fashioning a Reign" to celebrate her 90th birthday.

Attendants
The royal couple had seven bridal attendants. The Hon. David Ogilvy, son of Lord Ogilvy, thus the groom's nephew, and Simon Hay, son of courtiers Lady Margaret and Sir Alan Hay and great-grandson of the 6th Marquess of Hertford, were page boys. Princess Alexandra was attended by five bridesmaids: Princess Anne, daughter of Queen Elizabeth II and Prince Philip, thus the bride's paternal first cousin once removed and maternal second cousin; Archduchess Elisabeth of Austria, granddaughter of Princess Elizabeth of Greece and Denmark, thus the bride's maternal first cousin once removed; The Hon. Doune Ogilvy, daughter of Lord Ogilvy, thus the groom's niece; Georgina Butter, daughter of Myra Butter, thus the bride's maternal fourth cousin and also her goddaughter; and Emma Tennant, daughter of Lady Margaret and Iain Tennant, thus the groom's niece. 

Ogilvy's best man was the Hon. Peregrine Fairfax, second son of the 12th Lord Fairfax of Cameron.

Guests

Princess Alexandra and Angus Ogvily were married in front of a congregation of 2000 guests. Notable guests in attendance included:

Relatives of the bride

British royal family
 Princess Marina, Duchess of Kent, the bride's mother
 The Duke and Duchess of Kent, the bride's brother and sister-in-law
 Prince Michael of Kent, the bride's brother
 The Queen and The Duke of Edinburgh, the bride's paternal first cousin and her husband, the bride's maternal first cousin once removed
 The Prince of Wales, the bride's paternal first cousin once removed
 The Princess Anne, the bride's paternal first cousin once removed
 Queen Elizabeth The Queen Mother, the bride's paternal aunt by marriage
 The Princess Margaret, Countess of Snowdon, and The Earl of Snowdon, the bride's paternal first cousin and her husband
 The Princess Royal, the bride's paternal aunt
 The Earl and Countess of Harewood, the bride's paternal first cousin and his wife
 Viscount Lascelles, the bride's paternal first cousin once removed
 The Duke and Duchess of Gloucester, the bride's paternal uncle and aunt
 Prince William of Gloucester, the bride's paternal first cousin
 Prince Richard of Gloucester, the bride's paternal first cousin
 Princess Alice, Countess of Athlone, the bride's paternal first cousin twice removed and grandaunt by marriage
 The Earl Mountbatten of Burma, the bride's paternal second cousin once removed

Relatives of the groom

Ogilvy family
The Earl and Countess of Airlie, the groom's parents
 The Lord and Lady Lloyd, the groom's sister and brother-in-law
 Lady Margaret and Iain Tennant, the groom's sister and brother-in-law
 Miss Emma Tennant, the bridegroom's niece
 Lady Griselda and Major Peter Balfour, the groom's sister and brother-in-law
 Lord and Lady Ogilvy, the groom's brother and sister-in-law
 The Hon. Doune Ogvily, the groom's niece
 The Hon. David Ogilvy, the groom's nephew
 The Hon. James and Mrs Ogilvy, the groom's brother and sister-in-law

Other royal guests
 The Queen of Denmark, the bride's paternal second cousin once removed 
 Princess Anne-Marie of Denmark, the bride's paternal and maternal third cousin
 The Queen of the Hellenes, the bride's maternal and paternal second cousin once removed, and wife of her first cousin, once removed 
 The Crown Prince of Greece, the bride's maternal second cousin
 Princess Irene of Greece and Denmark, the bride's maternal second cousin 
 Princess Irene of the Netherlands, the bride's maternal second cousin once removed 
 Princess Margriet of the Netherlands the bride's maternal second cousin once removed 
 The King of Norway, the bride's paternal first cousin once removed
 The Crown Prince of Norway, the bride's paternal second cousin 
 The Queen of Sweden, the bride's paternal second cousin once removed 
 Princess Margaretha of Sweden, the bride's paternal third cousin
 Princess Désirée of Sweden, the bride's paternal third cousin
 The Margrave and Margravine of Baden, the bride's double second cousin once removed and the bride's maternal first cousin once removed
 Prince Ludwig of Baden, the bride's maternal second cousin
 Prince and Princess George William of Hanover, the bride's double second cousin once removed and the bride's maternal first cousin once removed
  Princess Clarissa of Hesse, the bride's maternal second cousin
 The Prince and Princess of Hesse and by Rhine, the bride's paternal second cousin once removed and his wife
 The Princess of Hohenlohe-Langenburg, the bride's maternal first cousin once removed
 Princess Beatrix of Hohenlohe-Langenburg, the bride's maternal second cousin
 Prince Rupprecht of Hohenlohe-Langenburg, the bride's maternal second cousin
 The Duchess of Aosta, the bride's maternal first cousin once removed
 Queen Victoria Eugenie of Spain, the bride's paternal first cousin twice removed
 The Prince and Princess of Asturias, the bride's paternal third cousin and the bride's maternal second cousin
 Queen Mother Helen of Romania, the bride's maternal first cousin once removed
 Princess and Prince Paul of Yugoslavia, the bride's maternal aunt and uncle
 Prince Alexander of Yugoslavia, the bride's maternal first cousin

Other notable guests
 Harold Macmillan, Prime Minister of the United Kingdom, and Lady Dorothy Macmillan
 R.A. Butler, First Secretary of State, and Mrs Butler
 Duncan Sandys, Secretary of State for the Colonies, and Mrs Sandys
 The Earl of Home, Foreign Secretary, and The Countess of Home
 The Earl and Countess Attlee, former Prime Minister and his wife
 The Earl and Countess of Avon, former Prime Minister and his wife
 Lady Churchill, wife of former Prime Minister Sir Winston Churchill
 The Lord and Lady Fisher of Lambeth, former Archbishop of Canterbury and his wife

Aftermath
After the ceremony, Alexandra and Angus left the Abbey in the glass coach for the reception at St James's Palace. The couple honeymooned on the Balmoral estate. They had two children, James (born 1964) and Marina (born 1966). They remained married until Ogilvy's death on 26 December 2004 at the age of 76.

References

External links
Order of Service for the wedding

Alexandra and Angus Ogilvy
1963 in London
Alexandra and Angus Ogilvy
April 1963 events in the United Kingdom
Alexandra and Angus Ogilvy